Olatunbosun Tijani (20 July 1977) is a Nigerian-British entrepreneur, co-founder, and CEO of Co-Creation Hub. Co-Creation Hub works at the forefront of accelerating the application of innovation and social capital for a better society.

Bosun was named as one of the 100 Most Influential People on the continent by New Africa Magazine. He received and initiated the visit of Mark Zuckerberg for the first time in Nigeria in August 2016. In 2019, Co-creation Hub acquired Kenya's iHub under Bosun's leadership.

Educational background 
Tijani holds a diploma in Computer Science and (B.Sc.) in Economics from the University of Jos, and MSc in Information systems and Management from the Warwick Business School and is currently a Postgraduate Researcher in Innovation Systems at the University of Leicester

Career 
Before CcHUB, Tijani had worked with the International Trade Centre. During this period, he successfully led the development and deployment of a web-marketing and information services programme in Ghana between March and September 2006 and subsequently in Uganda and Kenya which recorded positive outputs. The programme was deployed in Ethiopia and extended to South Africa and Tanzania. At Hewlett Packard, he successfully managed the deployment of the ODel learning centre at the Africa Virtual University in Kenya and completed the deployment of the HP, IEEE and University of Ibadan telecentre in Nigeria. He also initiated and completed the deployment of the HP Micro-enterprise Acceleration Programme learning centre at the Lagos Business School in Nigeria and provided recognizable support to its deployment in Egypt and Morocco. Tijani would later move to Pera Innovation Network (PERA) where he served as the European Innovation Manager. At PERA, he led the coordination of innovation agencies across Europe. In CcHUB, Tijani has led social technology projects including Lagos Innovation Hotspots and i-HQ. He has also driven the growth of social innovation using technology, producing initiatives and businesses that have influenced; environment, fiscal transparency, e-commerce, Healthcare, education, wellness  and transportation. He also prompted the visit of Mark Zuckerberg to CcHUB on his first ever visit to Sub-Saharan Africa.
	
He is a fellow of the Centre for Democracy and Rule of Law at the Stanford University and an associate of the Desmond Tutu Leadership Fellowship.

Personal life 
Tijani resides in Leicester and Lagos with his wife, Moji Tijani and two children.

References 

1977 births
Living people
Web developers
Nigerian technology businesspeople
Yoruba businesspeople
21st-century Nigerian businesspeople
Nigerian company founders
University of Jos alumni
Alumni of Warwick Business School
Businesspeople from Lagos